Tassili is the fifth album by the Tuareg-Berber band Tinariwen, recorded in Tassili n'Ajjer, an Algerian national park in 2011. The album marked a major departure from previous recordings. The producer, Ian Brennan, stated that it "was the least overdubbed, most live, band-centric and song-oriented record they have done.”

The album won a Grammy Award for Best World Music Album in 2012.

Recording sessions 
The album was recorded during a three-week session in the rocky desert near Djanet, a town on the southern rim of the Tassili n'Ajjer plateau, in south-eastern Algeria. It was this protected region from which the group derived the album's name. The plateau served as an alternate location to record the album after Tessalit, the band's home town in northern Mali, proved to be too precarious due to renewed conflict.

The region's close proximity to Libya made it a place of relative safe passage for Kel Tamashek fighters who traveled from the refugee camps in Libya to the battlefront of northern Mali during the 1980s and the Tuareg Rebellion during the early 1990s. It was during this time that the group's founding members first came to play together as political exiles in tents and around campfires of refugee settlements.

The rehearsals for and recording of the album were conducted in similar way to those original performances.

Tinariwen, in addition to largely substituting both acoustic guitars and unamplified percussion for their usual electric guitars (reflecting their return to an older way of life), also had hundreds of pounds of recording equipment and other gear transported to a canyon deep in the desert (running off a generator placed far enough from the microphones in the main tent to prevent noise pollution).

Gregory Davis and Roger Lewis of the Dirty Dozen Brass Band, with arrangement by Ian Brennan, contributed to the fourth track "Ya Messinagh". Kyp Malone and Tunde Adebimpe from the American art rock band, TV on the Radio, traveled to the isolated recording site in Mali, staying eight days and contributing backing vocal harmonies on five tracks and lead vocals on one track. They had first met Tinariwen two years before at the Coachella festival in California when the two bands were on the same bill. Nels Cline, the guitarist from the American alternative rock band Wilco, played on the first track, "Imidiwan Ma Tenam".

The album was mixed by David Odlum at Studio Soyuz in Paris during February 2011 and at Studio Black Box in Angers during March 2011. It was mastered by John Golden at the Golden Mastering recording studio in Ventura, California during April 2011.

Reception 

Bob Boilen stated in a review of the album for NPR Music that "Tinariwen is just about the best guitar-based rock band of the 21st century."

Elysa Gardner of USA Today gave the album 2.5 stars out of 4. At Metacritic, which assigns a normalised rating out of 100 to reviews from mainstream critics, the album received a score of 80, based on 37 reviews, indicating "generally favorable reviews". Uncut placed the album at number 18 on its list of the top 50 albums of 2011.

Mojo placed the album at number 35 on its list of "Top 50 albums of 2011."

On 12 February 2012, the album won a Grammy Award for Best World Music Album.

Track listing

Note: A two-disc special edition of the album includes a bonus disc with the tracks "Djegh Ishilan", "El Huria Telitwar", "Kud Edazamin", and "Nak Ezzaragh Tinariwen".

Personnel 

All information from album liner notes. 
 Ibrahim Ag Alhabib – lead vocals and lead guitar (except track 12)
 Abdallah Ag Alhousseyni – lead vocals and lead guitar (track 12)
 Alhassane Ag Touhami –backing vocals (all tracks)
 Eyadou Ag Leche – bass, guitar, percussion, backing vocals (all tracks), lead vocals (track 3)
 Elaga Ag Hamid – guitar, backing vocals (all tracks)
 Said Ag Ayad – percussion, backing vocals (all tracks)
 Mohamad Ag Tahada – percussion, backing vocals (all tracks)
 Mustapha Ag Ahmed – backing vocals (all tracks)
 Aroune Ag Alhabib – guitar, backing vocals (track 11)
 Kyp Malone – guitar (tracks 3, 5, 11), vocals (tracks 2, 11)
 Tunde Adebimpe – vocals (tracks 3, 5, 7)
 Nels Cline – guitar (track 1)
 Dirty Dozen Brass Band – horns (track 4)

References

External links 
 Slideshow at New York Times
  - a video documentary about the recording of Tassili
 Original Tuareg lyrics  and English translation at the official Tinariwen website
 Performance of Imidiwan Ma Tenam on The Colbert Report
 
 Tenere Taqqim Tossam on SoundCloud
 Interview with Tinariwen about Tassili at Mondomix

2011 albums
Anti- (record label) albums
Grammy Award for Best World Music Album
Tinariwen albums